This is a list of all penalty shoot-outs that have occurred in the Finals tournament of the FIFA Women's World Cup.

Twice, in 1999 and 2011, the World Cup title has been decided by a penalty shoot-out. Of the 30 shoot-outs that have taken place in the competition, only one reached the sudden death stage after still being tied at the end of "best of five kicks".

Penalty shoot-outs
 Key

  = scored penalty
  = missed penalty

  = scored penalty ending the shoot-out
  = missed penalty ending the shoot-out

  = first penalty in the shoot-out
 horizontal line within a list of takers = beginning of the sudden death stage

Notes

Statistics

Shoot-out records
Most shoot-outs in a tournament
3 - 2011

Tournament with no shoot-outs
3 - 1991, 2003, 2007

Most played shoot-out
 1 - 8 matches

Most penalties in a shoot-out 
12 -   vs  (1999)

Fewest penalties in a shoot-out
7 -  vs  (2019)

Fewest scores in a shoot-out
4 -  vs  (2011)

Most misses in a shoot-out
4 -  vs  (2011)

Most scored in a shoot-out
9 -   vs  (1999),  vs  (1999),  vs  (2015)

Team records
Most played
 3 -  (1999, 2011, 2011)

Most played in one tournament
 2 -  (2011)  1/1

Most won
 2 -  (1999, 2011)

Most lost
 1 -  (2019)
 1 -  (2011)
 1 -  (1999)
 1 -  (2011)
 1 -  (2015)
 1 -  (1999)
 1 -  (2011)

Most consecutive wins
 2 -  (1999, 2011)

Most won without ever losing
 1 -  (2015)
 1 -  (2011)

Most lost without ever winning
 1 -  (2019) 
 1 -  (2011)
 1 -  (1995)

Most knockout matches played, never playing a shoot-out
 6 -

By team

See also
List of FIFA World Cup penalty shoot-outs

References

FIFA Women's World Cup records and statistics
Lists of FIFA Women's World Cup matches

FIFA